Byzantine and Modern Greek Studies or BMGS is a peer reviewed British journal which contains articles that pertain to both Byzantine Studies and Modern Greek studies, i.e. the language, literature, history and archaeology of the post-classical Greek world, from Late Antiquity to the present day, and also reviews of recent books of importance to Byzantine and Modern Greek studies. It is published annually, from 1975 to the current day, by the Centre of Byzantine, Ottoman and Modern Greek Studies at the University of Birmingham.

External links 
Departmental webpage

European history journals
Publications established in 1975
Byzantine studies journals
Modern Greek studies
Cambridge University Press academic journals